The Port Mann Bridge is a 10-lane cable-stayed bridge in British Columbia, Canada that opened to traffic in 2012. It carries 10 lanes of traffic with space reserved for a light rail line.

The cable-stayed bridge replaced a steel arch bridge that spanned the Fraser River, connecting Coquitlam to Surrey in British Columbia in the Vancouver metro area. After its successor was opened to traffic, the old bridge was demolished by reverse construction, which process took three years to complete.

History
The original Port Mann Bridge opened on June 12, 1964. It was named after the community of Port Mann, through which the south end of the bridge passed. The old bridge consisted of three spans with an orthotropic deck carrying five lanes (originally four lanes) of Trans-Canada Highway traffic, with approach spans of three steel plate girders and concrete deck. Volume on the old bridge was 127,000 trips per day. Approximately 8 percent of the traffic on the Port Mann bridge was truck traffic. The old bridge was the longest arch bridge in Canada and third-longest in the world at the time of its inauguration.

At the time of construction, it was the most expensive piece of highway in Canada. The first "civilian" to drive across the bridge was CKNW reporter Marke Raines. He was not authorized to cross, so he drove quickly.

In 2001 an eastbound HOV lane was added by moving the centre divider and by cantilevering the bridge deck outwards in conjunction with a seismic upgrade.

Replacement

On January 31, 2006, the British Columbia Ministry of Transportation introduced the Gateway Program as a means to address growing congestion. The project originally envisioned twinning the Port Mann Bridge by building a second bridge adjacent to it, but the project was changed to building a 10-lane replacement bridge, planned to be the widest in the world, and demolishing the original bridge. While the old bridge was found to be in "excellent shape, it is a fracture-critical structure with a tension member that runs the full length of the bridge. If that fractures anywhere, the bridge’s structural safety can be compromised heavily...There is no built-in redundancy [in this type of bridge]. It only takes a little undetected fatigue crack to grow for 10 years and then a member eventually just snaps through one cold morning when the wrong size truck rolls over it”.

Opposition to twinning plan
A number of groups lobbied to improve public transit rather than build a new bridge. Burnaby city council, Vancouver city council, and directors of the GVRD (now Metro Vancouver) passed resolutions opposing the Port Mann / Highway 1 expansion. Opponents of the expansion included local environmental groups, urban planners, and Washington state's Sightline Institute.

Opponents argued that increasing highway capacity would increase greenhouse gas emissions and only relieve congestion for a few years before increased traffic congested the area again, and that expanding road capacity would encourage suburban sprawl. The Livable Region Coalition urged the Minister of Transportation,  Kevin Falcon, to consider rapid transit lines and improved bus routes instead of building the new bridge. The David Suzuki Foundation claimed the plan violated the goals of Metro Vancouver's Livable Region Strategic Plan.

Construction and cost
The Port Mann / Highway 1 project added another HOV lane and will provide cycling and pedestrian access. The multi-use pedestrian/bicycle path opened July 1, 2015. A bus service was reintroduced over the Port Mann Bridge for the first time in over 20 years. However, critics claimed that the new bridge only delayed the reintroduction of bus service on the bridge. The new bus rapid transit service is now operated in the HOV lanes along Highway 1 from Langley to Burnaby.

Of this, the bridge itself comprised roughly a third ($820 million). The total cost, including operation and maintenance, was expected to be $3.3 billion. Now that the new bridge is completed, the existing bridge, which was more than 45 years old, has been taken down.

The project was intended to be funded by using a public-private partnership, and Connect B.C. Development Group was chosen as the preferred developer. The Connect B.C. Group included the Macquarie Group, Transtoll Inc., Peter Kiewit Sons Co., and Flatiron Constructors. Although a memorandum of understanding had been signed by the province, final terms could not be agreed upon. As a consequence, the province decided to fund the entire cost of replacement.

On September 18, 2012, the new Port Mann Bridge opened to eastbound traffic. The Port Mann Bridge was overtaken by the San Francisco–Oakland Bay Bridge in 2013.

Demolition of original bridge
Demolition by detonation would have been much quicker but could have potentially impacted the river which is a busy shipping route and has large fish stocks, so the reverse construction option was chosen instead. Work to dismantle the old Port Mann Bridge began in December 2012. Crews removed sections of the bridge piece by piece in opposite order in which they were originally constructed, starting with the road deck, followed by the bridge approach's girders, and concluding with the steel arch. It was fully removed by October 21, 2015.

New bridge

The new bridge was built to accommodate the future installation of light rapid transit.

Issues
On February 10, 2012, during construction of the replacement bridge, an overhead gantry crane collapsed, causing a 90-tonne concrete box-girder segment to drop into the water below. While no one was injured, the accident delayed subsequent construction. WorkSafeBC inspectors evaluated the safety practices on the construction site.

On December 19, 2012, cold weather caused ice to accumulate on the supporting cables, periodically dropping to the car deck below, dubbed "ice bombs". ICBC, the vehicle insurance entity in British Columbia, reported 60 separate claims of ice damage during the incident. In addition, one driver required an ambulance due to injuries. The RCMP closed the bridge between 1:30 p.m. and 6 p.m. while engineers investigated. The Government installed collars on the cables that are manually released when conditions for ice accumulation are expected. They are installed on the tops of the cables on the towers and are released, falling down the cables by gravity to remove any snow build up.

During December 2016, "slush bombs" affected the bridge again though the BC Government stated that these weren't as severe as the 2012 "ice bombs." During December, the bridge was closed due to the threat of falling snow off of the cables and possible icy conditions.

Tolling (2012–2017)
In order to recover construction and operating costs, the bridge was electronically tolled when originally built. The toll rates increased to $1.60 for motorcycle, $3.15 for cars, $6.30 for small trucks and $9.45 for large trucks on August 15, 2015.  Through increased prices and greater traffic, Transportation Investment Corporation (TI Corp), the public Crown corporation responsible for toll operations on the Port Mann Bridge, forecast its revenue would grow by 85% between fiscal years 2014 and 2017. These fees were assessed using radio-frequency identification (RFID) decals or licence plate photos. A B.C. licensed driver who owes more than $25 in tolls outstanding 90 days is penalized $20 and is unable to purchase vehicle insurance or renew drivers permits without payment of the debt. Out-of-province drivers were also contacted for payment by a US-based contractor. A licence plate processing fee of $2.30 per trip was added to the toll rate for unregistered users who did not pay their toll within seven days of their passage. Monthly passes, which allowed unlimited crossing on the bridge, were available for purchase. Users may have set up an account for online payment of tolls. Users who opted for this method received a decal with an embedded RFID to place on their vehicle's windshield or headlight and avoid paying a processing fee. Tolls were expected to be removed by the year of 2050 or after collecting $3.3 billion. As announced by B.C. Premier John Horgan in August 2017, all tolls on the Port Mann Bridge were removed on September 1, 2017.  Debt service was transferred to the province of British Columbia at a cost of $135 million per year.

Traffic volumes

Monthly mean weekday traffic

Total monthly traffic (in millions)

See also

 List of crossings of the Fraser River
 List of bridges in Canada
 Tallest structures in Canada

References

Buildings and structures in Coquitlam
Buildings and structures in Surrey, British Columbia
Bridges completed in 1964
Bridges completed in 2012
Bridges in Greater Vancouver
Bridges on the Trans-Canada Highway
Bridges over the Fraser River
Cable-stayed bridges in Canada
Port Mann Bridge (1964)
Port Mann Bridge (1964)
Road bridges in British Columbia
Through arch bridges in Canada
Tied arch bridges in Canada
Transport in Coquitlam
Toll bridges in Canada